Sunil Chhatrapal Kedar (born 7 April 1961) is a Cabinet Minister in the Maharashtra government and an Indian politician of Indian National Congress who was born in Nagpur. Sunil Kedar is son of late former Maharashtra minister and pioneer of co-operative movement in Nagpur district, Chhatrapal Kedar (Also known as Babasaheb Kedar).

Personal life 
Sunil Kedar was born on 7 April 1961 in Nagpur. He is the son of former Minister Chhatrapal Kedar. He graduated in agricultural science and has obtained his Master of Business and Management. He is married to Anuja Vijaykar (daughter of Kundatai Vijaykar and granddaughter of Barrister S. K. Wankhede). The couple has two daughters named Purnima and Pallavi. He is a businessman and farmer by profession.

Political career 
Sunil Kedar's political journey started when he was elected in 1992 as a Nagpur Zilha Parishad Member. In 1995 in the 9th Maharashtra Legislative Assembly he was elected independently from Saoner Assembly Constituency. In 1995 Kedar was a Minister of State for the ministries of Ministry of Power and Ministry of Transport. And in 1996 he also became Minister of State for the ministry of Ports. Again In 2004 in the 11th Maharashtra Legislative Assembly he was elected independently from Saoner assembly constituency. In 2009 in the 12th Maharashtra Legislative Assembly he was elected from Saoner assembly constituency as an Indian National Congress candidate. And again in 2014 in 13th Maharashtra Legislative Assembly he was elected from Saoner assembly constituency as an Indian National Congress candidate.

In 2019 in the 14th Maharashtra Legislative Assembly he was elected from Saoner assembly constituency as an Indian national congress candidate and became cabinet minister of Maharashtra State.

References

Maharashtra MLAs 2014–2019
Maharashtra MLAs 1995–1999
Maharashtra MLAs 2004–2009
Maharashtra MLAs 2009–2014
Independent politicians in India
People from Nagpur district
Marathi politicians
Living people
1961 births
Indian National Congress politicians from Maharashtra